Love and Rage is a 2009 Danish thriller film directed by Morten Giese.

References

External links 

2009 thriller films
2009 films
Danish thriller films
2000s Danish-language films